Floyd B. Danskin (May 1, 1889 – March 31, 1971) was an American politician in the state of Washington. He served in the Washington House of Representatives from 1921 to 1933. He was Speaker of the House from 1925 to 1927.

References

1971 deaths
1889 births
Republican Party members of the Washington House of Representatives
20th-century American politicians